Langgai Tinggang (other names also include Langgai Tinggan, Langgi Tinggang, Mandau Langgi Tinggan) is a traditional sword of the Sea Dayak people, originating from Borneo. The name Langgai Tinggang means "the longest tail-feather of a hornbill".

Description 
This sword is almost identical to Niabor, but with a hilt resembling that of Mandau. The blade has a convex edge and concave back. On both sides a broad rib runs from the finger guard to the tip. The finger guard is smaller than of the Niabor and is further removed from the hilt. Unlike the finger guard of the Niabor, the Langgai Tinggang has a finger guard that is similar of the Mandau's. Another feature that separates the Langgai Tinggang from Niabor is the pommel of the Langgai Tinggang is always decorated with animal hair.

See also 

 Mandau
 Niabor
 Pisau raut

References 

Blade weapons
Southeast Asian swords
Weapons of Indonesia
Weapons of Malaysia